The Saxon Motor Car Store, at 316 E. Sixth St. in Georgetown, Texas, was built in 1920.  It was listed on the National Register of Historic Places in 1986.

It is a wood frame commercial building.

References

National Register of Historic Places in Williamson County, Texas
Buildings and structures completed in 1920